Otaria was one of five s built for the  (Royal Italian Navy) during the early 1900s. The boat served in World War I and ceased service in 1918.

Construction and career
Otaria was laid down on 10 May 1905 at the Regio Arsenale at Venice, launched on 25 March 1908 and completed on 1 July 1908. She was employed as a training ship in the Tyrrhenian Sea.

After an intensive training, in August 1914 the submarine was assigned to the 4th submarines squadron based in Venice and put under the command of Lieutenant Emanuele Ponzio. At the start of the First World War for Italy the ship was re-assigned to the 1st submarines squadron based in the Adriatic Sea and was employed as a defensive unit in the Gulf of Venice.

In June 1916 Otaria was deployed in Taranto, forming a separate unit combined with the twin submarine  and later on January 1917 he was transferred again in Venice and assigned to the 2nd submarines squadron.

In December of the same year the submarine was transferred in Porto Corsini and later in 1918 disarmed and demolished.

Throughout the war, the Otaria had carried out a total of 46 defensive missions.

References

Bibliography

External links
 Otaria (1908) Marina Militare website

1908 ships
otaria
Ships built by Venetian Arsenal
Glauco-class submarines (1905)